This is a list of dystopian comics.
Akira by Katsuhiro Otomo
Bitch Planet by Kelly Sue DeConnick and Valentine De Landro
"Days of Future Past" (The Uncanny X-Men #141-142) by Chris Claremont, John Byrne and Terry Austin
V for Vendetta by Alan Moore follows the exploits of the anarchist V and his struggle in a Britain ruled by a fascist party.

References

See also
 Lists of dystopian works

Dystopian comics
Lists of comics by genre